Sun Huaishan (born July 1952) is a former Chinese politician who served as the Director of Hong Kong, Macao, Taiwan and Overseas Chinese Committee of the National Committee of the Chinese People's Political Consultative Conference. He was investigated in March 2017 by the Communist Party's anti-graft agency, suspected of corruption.

Career
Sun Huaishan was born in Lianshui County, Jiangsu. He was graduated from Harbin Institute of Technology, and worked in Jinhu County Agricultural Machinery Factory. In 1973, Sun joined Communist Youth League of China, and became the CYL Secretary of Jinhu County. In 1987, he became the Deputy Director, Director of the General Office of the Communist Youth League, and he became the Deputy Secretary of the National Committee of the Chinese People's Political Consultative Conference. In 2010, he became the Party Secretary of the National Committee of the Chinese People's Political Consultative Conference. Sun was by-elected the Director of Hong Kong, Macao, Taiwan and Overseas Chinese Committee of the National Committee of the Chinese People's Political Consultative Conference in August 2016.

Downfall
In February 2017, Ming Pao reported that Sun was investigated by the Central Commission for Discipline Inspection. The CCDI confirmed that Sun was investigated on March 2, 2017. He was expelled from the Communist Party on June 2, 2017.

On September 17, 2018, Sun was sentenced on 14 years in prison and fined three million yuan for taking bribes worth 39.75 million yuan by the Intermediate People's Court in Hulun Buir.

References

1952 births
Living people
People's Republic of China politicians from Jiangsu
Chinese Communist Party politicians from Jiangsu
Members of the 18th Central Committee of the Chinese Communist Party
Harbin Institute of Technology alumni
Expelled members of the Chinese Communist Party